The New Park Street Chapel was a Reformed Baptist church in Southwark in London built in 1833. The fellowship began worshipping together in 1650. Its first pastor was William Rider, and many notable others have filled the position since, including Benjamin Keach, Dr. John Gill, Dr. John Rippon, and C. H. Spurgeon. The Metropolitan Tabernacle at Elephant and Castle still worships and holds to its historical principles under its present pastor, Dr. Peter Masters.

History
From 1650, when the English Parliament banned independent Christian organisations from meeting together, this congregation braved persecution until 1688, when the Baptists were once again allowed to worship in freedom. At this point, the group built their first chapel, in the Tower Bridge area.

In 1720, Dr. John Gill became pastor and served for 51 years. In 1773, Dr. John Rippon became pastor and served for 63 years. During these times, the church experienced great growth and became one of the largest congregations in the country. The congregation moved to New Park Street from the Baptist meeting-house in Carter Lane, Tooley Street in 1833. The New Park Street chapel could seat 1200 people.

In 1854, the most famous of all the pastors at New Park Street started serving at the youthful age of 20. His name was Charles Haddon Spurgeon, and he quickly became the most popular British preacher of his day. The church soon became so full that services had to be held in hired halls such as the Surrey Music Hall.

During Spurgeon's ministry, it was decided that the church should be expanded to accommodate the overflowing crowds who sat in window sills and lined up outside. In 1856 the expansion removed the wall behind the pulpit and allowed for about 200 more seats. As this was still not enough room the elders decided to move permanently to a larger premises. The location chosen was the Elephant & Castle, a very prominent location near the River Thames in South London, partly because it was thought to be the site of the burning of the Southwark Martyrs. The church was finished in 1861 and dedicated on March 18.

Pastors both past & present

William Rider, c. 1653 – c. 1665 (12 yrs)
Benjamin Keach, 1668–1704 (36 yrs)
Benjamin Stinton, 1704–18 (14 yrs)
Dr. John Gill, 1720–71 (51 yrs)
Dr. John Rippon, 1773–1836 (63 years)
Joseph Angus, 1837–39 (2 yrs)
James Smith, 1841–50 (8½ yrs)
William Walters, 1851–53 (2 yrs)
Charles Spurgeon, 1854–92 (38 yrs)
Arthur Tappan Pierson 1891–93
Thomas Spurgeon, 1893–1908 (15 yrs)
Archibald G. Brown, 1908–11 (3 yrs)
Dr. Amzi Clarence Dixon, 1911–19 (8 years)
Harry Tydeman Chilvers, 1919–35 (15½ yrs)
Dr. W Graham Scroggie, 1938–43 (5 yrs)
W G Channon, 1944–49 (5 yrs)
Gerald B Griffiths, 1951–54 (3 yrs)
Eric W Hayden, 1956–62 (6 yrs)
Dennis Pascoe 1963–69 (6 yrs)
Dr. Peter Masters, 1970–present

External links
Metropolitan Tabernacle official site
History page on official site 

Churches completed in 1833
19th-century churches in the United Kingdom
Former Baptist churches in England
Churches in the London Borough of Southwark
Former buildings and structures in the London Borough of Southwark
1650 establishments in England
Religious organizations established in the 1650s
17th-century Protestant churches